Civil Registration System or CRS in India is the unified process of continuous, permanent, compulsory and universal recording of the vital events (birth, deaths, stillbirths) and characteristics thereof. The data generated through CRS is essential for socio-economic planning.

crsorgi.gov.in is a dedicated website for birth and death recording in India.

Website 

 official website

References 

Civil Registration and Vital Statistic